Psammodiini is a tribe of aphodiine dung beetles in the family Scarabaeidae. There are about 12 genera and at least 50 described species in Psammodiini.

Genera
 Diastictus Mulsant, 1842
 Geopsammodius Gordon & Pittino, 1992
 Leiopsammodius Rakovic, 1981
 Neopsammodius Rakovic, 1986
 Odontopsammodius Gordon & Pittino, 1992
 Parapsammodius Gordon & Pittino, 1992
 Platytomus Mulsant, 1842
 Pleurophorus Mulsant, 1842
 Psammodius Fallén, 1807
 Rhyssemus Mulsant, 1842
 Tesarius Rakovic, 1981
 Trichiorhyssemus Clouët, 1901

References

 Bouchard, P., Y. Bousquet, A. Davies, M. Alonso-Zarazaga, J. Lawrence, C. Lyal, A. Newton, et al. (2011). "Family-group names in Coleoptera (Insecta)". ZooKeys, vol. 88, 1–972.

Further reading

 Arnett, R. H. Jr., M. C. Thomas, P. E. Skelley and J. H. Frank. (eds.). (21 June 2002). American Beetles, Volume II: Polyphaga: Scarabaeoidea through Curculionoidea. CRC Press LLC, Boca Raton, Florida .
 Arnett, Ross H. (2000). American Insects: A Handbook of the Insects of America North of Mexico. CRC Press.
 Richard E. White. (1983). Peterson Field Guides: Beetles. Houghton Mifflin Company.

Scarabaeidae